Bailliu is a surname. Notable people with the surname include:
Gilbert Bailliu (born 1936), Belgian footballer
Jeannine Bailliu, Canadian economist
Lionel Bailliu, French film-maker

See also
Bernard de Bailliu (1641-after 1684), Flemish engraver
Pieter de Bailliu (1613-after 1660), Flemish engraver